The 1989–90  League of Ireland Premier Division was the fifth season of the League of Ireland Premier Division. The Premier Division was made up of 12 teams.

Overview
The Premier Division was contested by 12 teams and St Patrick's Athletic F.C. won the championship.

Final Table

Results

Matches 1–22

Matches 23–33

Notes

See also
 1989–90 League of Ireland First Division

References

Ireland, 1989-90
1989–90 in Republic of Ireland association football
League of Ireland Premier Division seasons